The Bârsa Fierului is a left tributary of the river Bârsa in Romania. It source is in the eastern part of the Făgăraș Mountains.

References

Rivers of Romania
Rivers of Brașov County